Alexander George Cowie (born 9 May 1961) is a Scottish former professional football player and coach.

Career
Born in Buckie, Cowie joined West Ham United as an apprentice in 1977, turning professional in 1978. He made his senior debut on 13 April 1982, in a Division 1 match against Ipswich Town. He later played for Heart of Midlothian, Morton, Dunfermline Athletic, Deveronvale and Forres Mechanics, both latter clubs play in the Scottish Highland Football League.

After retiring as a player, Cowie was active as a coach in Oceania, where he served as manager of the Papua New Guinea national under-23 team and the Solomon Islands national team.

Honours

 Scottish Cup runner-up: 1985–86

References

1961 births
Living people
Scottish footballers
Scottish football managers
West Ham United F.C. players
Heart of Midlothian F.C. players
Greenock Morton F.C. players
Dunfermline Athletic F.C. players
Deveronvale F.C. players
Forres Mechanics F.C. players
English Football League players
Scottish Football League players
Scottish expatriate football managers
People from Buckie
Solomon Islands national football team managers
Association football defenders
Sportspeople from Moray